Krzymów  is a village in Konin County, Greater Poland Voivodeship, in west-central Poland. It is the seat of the gmina (administrative district) called Gmina Krzymów.

The village has a population of 524.

References

Villages in Konin County